Ewen is an unincorporated community and census-designated place (CDP) in McMillan Township, Ontonagon County, Michigan, United States. It is situated on the Upper Peninsula of Michigan along Highway M-28, which leads east  to Covington and west  to Wakefield. 

Ewen was first listed as a CDP prior to the 2020 census.

Demographics

References 

Census-designated places in Ontonagon County, Michigan
Census-designated places in Michigan
Unincorporated communities in Ontonagon County, Michigan
Unincorporated communities in Michigan